Santa Cruz Amilpas  is a town and municipality in Oaxaca in south-eastern Mexico. The municipality covers an area of 2.27 km². 
It is part of the Centro District in the Valles Centrales region.
In 2010, the municipality had a population of 10,120.

References

Municipalities of Oaxaca